The Infectious Disease Research Institute (IDRI) is a non-profit organization based in Seattle, in the United States, and which conducts global health research on infectious diseases.

History
IDRI was founded in 1993, by Steve Reed, PhD.

Malaria vaccine
IDRI is collaborating with the United States Agency for International Development to develop a malaria vaccine with the Walter Reed Army Institute of Research using Walter Reed's CelTOS malaria antigen in conjunction with IDRI's GLA-SE adjuvant.

Visceral leishmaniasis vaccine
In February 2012, IDRI launched the world's first clinical trial of the visceral leishmaniasis vaccine.  The vaccine is a recombinant form of two fused Leishmania parasite proteins with an adjuvant.  Two phase 1 clinical trials with healthy volunteers are to be conducted.  The first one takes place in Washington and is followed by a trial in India.  The trials are funded by the Bill & Melinda Gates Foundation.

References

External links
 

International medical and health organizations
Research institutes in Seattle